Sérgio Filipe Silva Barge (born 4 January 1984 in Válega, Ovar) is a Portuguese retired footballer who played as a right back or a midfielder.

References

External links

1984 births
Living people
Portuguese footballers
Association football defenders
Association football midfielders
Association football utility players
Primeira Liga players
Liga Portugal 2 players
Segunda Divisão players
C.D. Feirense players
A.D. Sanjoanense players
G.D. Estoril Praia players
C.F. Os Belenenses players
U.D. Oliveirense players
Cypriot First Division players
Alki Larnaca FC players
Portuguese expatriate footballers
Expatriate footballers in Cyprus
Portuguese expatriate sportspeople in Cyprus
People from Ovar
Sportspeople from Aveiro District